The 53rd Karlovy Vary International Film Festival took place from June 29 to July 7, 2018, in Karlovy Vary, Czech Republic.

A total of 236 films were presented at the festival, including 35 world premieres, eight international and seven European premieres.

Juries
The following were appointed as the juries at the 53rd edition:

Grand Jury
Mark Cousins (United Kingdom)
Zrinka Cvitešić (Croatia)
Marta Donzelli (Italy)
Zdeněk Holý (Czech Republic)
Nanouk Leopold (Netherlands)

FIPRESCI Jury
René Marx (France)
Marita Nyrhinen (Finland)
Alejandra Trelles (Uruguay)

Europa Cinemas Label Jury
Daira Āboliņa (Latvia)
Simon Blaas (Netherlands)
Balázs Kalmanovits (Hungary)
Jan Makosch (Germany)
 

East of the West
Peter Badač (Slovakia)
Iris Elezi (Albania)
Myriam Sassine (Lebanon)
Dounia Sichov (France)
Andrei Tănăsescu (Romania)

The Ecumenical Jury
Michael Otřísal (Czech Republic)
Milja Radovic (United Kingdom)
David Sipoš (Slovenia)

Documentary Films
Raúl Camargo (Chile)
M. Siam (Egypt)
Diana Tabakov (Czech Republic)

Fedeora Award
Stefan Dobroiu (Romania)
Natascha Drubek (Germany)
Nenad Dukić (Serbia)

Official selection

In competition

Highlighted title and dagger indicates Crystal Globe winner.
Highlighted title and double-dagger indicates Special Jury Prize winner.

Out of competition

Another View

Czech Films 2017–2018

Documentary Films

Highlighted title and dagger indicates Best Documentary Film winner.
Highlighted title and double-dagger indicates Documentary Special Jury Prize winner.

East of the West

Highlighted title and dagger indicates East of the West winner.
Highlighted title and double-dagger indicates East of the West Special Jury Prize winner.

Future Frames: Ten New Filmmakers to Follow

Horizons

Imagina

Made in Texas: Tribute to Austin Film Society

Midnight Screenings

Out of the Past

People Next Door

Prague Short Film Festival Presents

Reflections of Time: Baltic Poetic Documentary

Seven Close Encounters

Special Events

Awards
The following awards were presented at the 53rd edition:

Official selection awards
Grand Prix – Crystal Globe
I Do Not Care If We Go Down in History as Barbarians by Radu Jude

Special Jury Prize
Sueño Florianópolis by Ana Katz

Best Director
Olmo Omerzu for Winter Flies

Best Actress
Mercedes Morán for Sueño Florianópolis

Best Actor
Moshe Folkenflik for Redemption

Special Jury Mention
History of Love by Sonja Prosenc
Jumpman by Ivan I. Tverdovskiy

Other statutory awards
East of the West Grand Prix
Suleiman Mountain by Elizaveta Stishova

East of the West Special Jury Prize
Blossom Valley by László Csuja

Grand Prix for Best Documentary Film
Putin's Witnesses by Vitaly Mansky

Documentary Special Jury Prize
Walden by Daniel Zimmermann

Právo Audience Award
Rain Man by Barry Levinson

Crystal Globe for Outstanding Artistic Contribution to World Cinema
Tim Robbins (United States)
Barry Levinson (United States)

Festival President's Award
Robert Pattinson (United Kingdom)

Festival President's Award for Contribution to Czech Cinematography
Jaromír Hanzlík (Czech Republic)

Non-statutory awards
Award of International Film Critics (FIPRESCI)
Sueño Florianópolis by Ana Katz

The Ecumenical Jury Award
Redemption by Joseph Madmony, Boaz Yehonatan Yacov

Ecumenical Commendations
Winter Flies by Olmo Omerzu
Miriam Lies by Natalia Cabral, Oriol Estrada

FEDEORA Award
Suleiman Mountain by Elizaveta Stishova

Europa Cinemas Label Award
I Do Not Care If We Go Down in History as Barbarians by Radu Jude

References

Karlovy Vary International Film Festival
53rd Karlovy Vary International Film Festival
Karlovy Vary International Film Festival